The Macedonian Scientific Institute (MSI) is a Bulgarian scientific organization, which studies the region of Macedonia and mostly the Macedonian Bulgarians.

Establishment and activity

It was founded in 1923 by Macedonian Bulgarian professors and scholars at Sofia University. In the beginning, the Institute began to publish the journal Macedonian Review and other scientific studies on the Bulgarian population in Macedonia. The journal was concerned with Macedonia and all branches of the study of its history, culture and social life. In the 1930s, the Macedonian Scientific Institute was managed by the known Bulgarian Professor, Lyubomir Miletich. Under his direction, the Macedonian House of Culture in Sofia was built, where an ethnographic museum and library were established. After 1945, the activity of the MSI was changed to serve the macedonistic policy on the Macedonian Question in the People's Republic of Bulgaria and the Socialist Federal Republic of Yugoslavia. The new authorities began a policy of removing any Bulgarian influence, making Macedonia a connecting link for the establishment of new Balkan Federative Republic and thereby creating a distinct Slav Macedonian consciousness. In 1947, the Bulgarian Communist regime "recommended" the liquidation of the MSI. The archives and the whole museum collection (including the remains of the revolutionary Gotse Delchev) were transported to the newly established People's Republic of Macedonia.

Resumption
After the fall of Communism in 1990, the Macedonian Scientific Institute was restored and started publishing the Macedonian Review again. Each issue now has an accompanying English translation for the contents page and article summary.

The Macedonian Scientific Institute also accepted a research programme and have published new collections of documents, monographs etc. Its membership today consists of academics, professors, and public figures. It has bilateral relations with other organizations and especially with the Macedonian Patriotic Organization, as well as with scholars and scientific centres in Europe, the United States, Canada and Australia. Its publications are translated and issued abroad. Professors Otto Kronsteiner (Austria), Tadeusz Szymański (Poland) and Heinrich Stamler (USA) were elected to be foreign corresponding members of the MSI. Scientific meetings, conferences and other activities are part of the renewed work of the Macedonian Scientific Institute. It has to be noted that the MSI works in collaboration with the Thracian Scientific Institute, likewise a Bulgarian scientific organization which studies the region of Thrace and the Bulgarian part of its population. MSI has also developed scientific centers and branches in different cities in Bulgaria.

Presidents of MSI
 1923–1927 professor Ivan Georgov, philosopher from Veles
 1928–1937 professor Lyubomir Miletich, linguist from Štip
 1937–1944 professor Nikola Stoyanov, mathematician and astronomer from Dojran
 1945 – professor Dimitar Silyanovski, jurist from Kruševo
 1945–1947 Georgi Kulishev, jurist and politician from Dojran
 1990–1997 professor Petar Shapkarev, economist, by descend  from Ohrid
 1997–2008 professor Dimitar Gocev, historian from Pančarevo, Municipality of Pehčevo
 2008–2014 professor Trendafil Mitev, historian from Sofia
 2014–2020 associate professor Aleksandar Grebenarov, historian from Kardzhali
 2020 – associate professor Georgi Nikolov, historian from Sofia

See also
 Macedonia (terminology)

References

Research institutes in Bulgaria
Modern history of Macedonia (region)
Works about North Macedonia
Organizations established in 1923
1923 establishments in Bulgaria
Bulgaria–North Macedonia relations
Macedonian Question